Francis Henry Dumville Smythe (1873 - 1966)  was the Archdeacon of Lewes from 1929 to 1946.

Smythe was educated at Haileybury and Imperial Service College and Emmanuel College, Cambridge. He was ordained in 1898 and held curacies at South Petherton, Bunbury and Alfrick. held incumbencies in Horsted Keynes, Hove and Eastbourne; and died on 8 October 1966.

References

1873 births
Alumni of Emmanuel College, Cambridge
Archdeacons of Hastings
1966 deaths
People educated at Haileybury and Imperial Service College